Arbuthnott, Bervie and Kinneff Church  (known as ABK Church) is a Christian community in the south of Aberdeenshire.  It includes the town of Inverbervie, the villages of Catterline, Gourdon and Kinneff in addition to the area of Arbuthnott.

Formation 
Originally the three churches were entirely separate parishes, however Arbuthnott and Bervie have shared a minister before having a joint Kirk Session in the last decade. Kinneff was linked with Stonehaven South Parish Church before joining Arbuthnott and Bervie in order for Stonehaven South Parish Church to be linked with Stonehaven Dunnottar Parish Church. From 2007 to June 2009 Georgie Baxendale was the minister of the parish. The minister from 2010 to 2016 was Dennis Rose. On 7 March 2019, Andrew Morrison was ordained and inducted into the parish at the age of 27, making him the third youngest minister of the Church of Scotland.

Arbuthnott Church 

Located in the estate of Arbuthnott, the church is one of the oldest churches still in use for regular public worship in Scotland dating back to the pre-reformation days.  Consecrated in 1242 the church was dedicated to the memory of St Ternan.  The oldest part of the building is the chancel, with the rest of the building added around 1500. After the reformation the first minister was a member of the Arbuthnott family, who later went on to become a moderator of the Church of Scotland. Services of worship are held on Sundays at 9:30am. 

On 24th October 2021, a new extension was officially opened by the Rev. Linda Broadley, former locum minister at ABK Church. During her tenure, between the ministries of Dennis Rose and Andrew Morrison, fundraising began to ensure that toilet facilities were available for those who use the building. The extension, located towards the rear of the sanctuary, consists of a disabled friendly toilet and a small kitchenette (with sink and storage).

Bervie Church 
Inverbervie is the largest church within the parish with around 70 people attending worship every Sunday.  The current church building, located in the centre of town, opened in 1837.  The pipe organ was installed in 1904 and new stained glass doors designed by the pupils of Bervie School were added to mark the millennium. Services are held every Sunday at 11am. Each Sunday, there is a praise group leading some of the sung worship, as well as activities for toddlers, children and teenagers.

Kinneff Church 
Kinneff, despite its relatively small size, is home to two church buildings. The Kinneff Old Church, now owned and managed by Kinneff Old Church Trust, as well as the newer Kinneff Church, built originally as a Free Church. The former was closed in the middle of the 20th Century. After a congregational meeting in April 2010 it was decided to close the newer Kinneff Church also. Kinneff Church closed on Sunday 13 June 2010, and has now been converted into residential housing.

Gourdon Mission Hall 
The Gourdon Mission Hall has had very close ties to Bervie parish.  The small coastal village is located just south of Bervie.  Services are usually held at the Mission Hall every Sunday at 6pm, though from 31st October 2021, the time moved to 3pm as a trial period during the winter months.  The parish minister takes one service a month with a variety of guest speakers from churches in the wider Aberdeenshire and Angus, as well as from ABK Church itself, preaching the rest of the time.

Church Buildings 
As well as the three churches the church also owns several other buildings in Inverbervie.  The Church Centre (formerly the manse) is next to the main church building.  It contains several meeting rooms as well as a fully equipped office.  The main meeting room contains modern digital technology and kitchen facilities.  The Herd Centre (formerly the YWCA Hall) is at the bottom of Townhead.  The centre has a large hall as well as a fully equipped kitchen.  The Manse can be located in West Park housing estate on the edge of Inverbervie.

Church Life 
ABK Church remains an active Christian community. The church organises regular Alpha Courses, holiday clubs and social events where the whole community is invited to join in. In 2018, it started its own Messy Church in order to share the gospel of Jesus with the families in the community.

Links 
 ABK Church Facebook
 ABK Church Twitter

References

Church of Scotland churches in Scotland
Churches in Aberdeenshire